Scott David Durant  (born 12 February 1988) is a British rower and gold medallist in the Men's Eight at the 2016 Olympic Summer Games.

Rowing career
Durant started his rowing career at Lancaster Royal Grammar School (LRGS). He competed at the 2014 World Rowing Championships in Bosbaan, Amsterdam, where he won a silver medal as part of the coxed pair with Alan Sinclair and Henry Fieldman. The following year he was part of the British team that topped the medal table at the 2015 World Rowing Championships at Lac d'Aiguebelette in France, where he won a bronze medal as part of the coxless four with Alan Sinclair, Tom Ransley and Stewart Innes. He competed in the 2015 European Rowing Championships in Poznań winning a gold medal. 

He was a gold medallist in the men's eight at the 2016 Summer Olympics with Tom Ransley, Andrew Triggs Hodge, Matt Gotrel, Pete Reed, Paul Bennett, Matt Langridge, Will Satch and Phelan Hill .

Awards
Durant was appointed Member of the Order of the British Empire (MBE) in the 2017 New Year Honours for services to rowing.

References

External links
 

1988 births
Living people
British male rowers
Sportspeople from Los Angeles
World Rowing Championships medalists for Great Britain
Rowers at the 2016 Summer Olympics
Olympic rowers of Great Britain
Olympic gold medallists for Great Britain
Medalists at the 2016 Summer Olympics
Olympic medalists in rowing
Members of the Order of the British Empire
European Rowing Championships medalists